The Enterprise Hills are a prominent group of largely ice-free hills and peaks in the form of an arc. These hills were mapped by the United States Geological Survey from surveys and U.S. Navy air photos, 1961–66; the name was applied by the Advisory Committee on Antarctic Names in association with the name Heritage Range.

Features
Geographical features include:

 Ahrnsbrak Glacier
 Bell Valley
 Chappell Peak
 Connell Canyon
 Guarcello Peak
 Henderson Glacier
 Horseshoe Valley
 Mount Dolence
 Mount Rossman
 Parrish Peak
 Plummer Glacier
 Rhodes Bluff
 Schoeck Peak
 Seal Glacier
 Shoemaker Peak
 Strong Peak
 Sutton Peak
 Union Glacier
 Urban Point

References 

Hills of Ellsworth Land